South Carolina Highway 110 (SC 110) is a state highway in the U.S. state of South Carolina that travels  from US 29 in Cowpens to US 221 Alt and SC 11 at Cowpens National Battlefield near Chesnee. It is signed and internally designated as an east–west highway though it runs north–south physically.

Route description

SC 110 is a two-lane rural highway with relatively few intersections. The highway is named Battleground Road for the entire length. A section east of Mayo is also known as Cowpens Highway. The highway passes next to and ends at Cowpens National Battlefield.

History
The original SC 110 was created in 1936, running from US 221 in Chesnee north to the North Carolina border, where the road became the now-defunct NC 741. In 1942, the highway was renumbered as a part of US 221. The highway was resurrected in 1949 in its near-current form. When US 29, now I-85, was established in the mid-1950s, the highway was rerouted slightly to the west.

Junction list

See also

References

External links

SC 110 - South Carolina Hwy Index Home

110
Transportation in Cherokee County, South Carolina
Transportation in Spartanburg County, South Carolina